Ouvrage Granges Communes is a lesser work (petit ouvrage) of the Maginot Line's Alpine extension, the Alpine Line. The ouvrage consists of one infantry block facing Italy. Additional blocks were planned but not built.

The position was placed to control the Col de Raspaillon road descending from the Camp des Fourches toward Bousiéyas. Construction  began in 1931 and proceeded slowly due to design changes. By 1940 the entrance block remained uncompleted. The entrance block that presently exists was built in 1956 as part of a NATO policy of upgrading certain fortifications to block an advance by Warsaw Pact forces through northern Italy.

Description
See Fortified Sector of the Dauphiné for a broader discussion of the Dauphiné sector of the Alpine Line.
Block 1 (entry): one machine gun port, planned block largely unbuilt.
Block 2 (infantry block): two machine gun cloches, two heavy twin machine gun cloches and two machine gun embrasures.

Additional blocks were planned but not built. The underground portions of the ouvrage consist of two parallel galleries containing the garrison's living quarters, magazine and supporting utilities. The fortifications are presently abandoned and open to the elements.

See also
 List of Alpine Line ouvrages

References

Bibliography 
Allcorn, William. The Maginot Line 1928-45. Oxford: Osprey Publishing, 2003. 
Kaufmann, J.E. and Kaufmann, H.W. Fortress France: The Maginot Line and French Defenses in World War II, Stackpole Books, 2006. 
Kaufmann, J.E., Kaufmann, H.W., Jancovič-Potočnik, A. and Lang, P. The Maginot Line: History and Guide, Pen and Sword, 2011. 
Mary, Jean-Yves; Hohnadel, Alain; Sicard, Jacques. Hommes et Ouvrages de la Ligne Maginot, Tome 1. Paris, Histoire & Collections, 2001.  
Mary, Jean-Yves; Hohnadel, Alain; Sicard, Jacques. Hommes et Ouvrages de la Ligne Maginot, Tome 4 - La fortification alpine. Paris, Histoire & Collections, 2009.  
Mary, Jean-Yves; Hohnadel, Alain; Sicard, Jacques. Hommes et Ouvrages de la Ligne Maginot, Tome 5. Paris, Histoire & Collections, 2009.

External links 
 Granges Communes (petit ouvrage des) at fortiff.be 

GRAN
Maginot Line
Alpine Line